Huilong is a town of central Longchuan County in northeastern Guangdong province, China, situated  northeast of the county seat. , it has one residential community and 14 villages under its administration.

See also
List of township-level divisions of Guangdong

References

Township-level divisions of Guangdong